JP Sauni (born 7 July 1997) is a professional rugby union player who qualifies to play for New Zealand, Australia and Samoa. His position of choice is hooker.

References 

Australian rugby union players
1997 births
Living people
Melbourne Rising players
Rugby union hookers
Rugby union players from Auckland